The Office for Victims of Crime (OVC) is a part of the Office of Justice Programs, within the U.S. Department of Justice.

The OVC's mission is to provide aid and promote justice for crime victims.

The office was created in 1988 in an amendment to the Victims of Crime Act (VOCA) of 1984.

OVC sponsors the annual Crime Victims' Rights Week  that promotes victims' rights and services.

Jessica E. Hart was appointed to the role of Director by President Donald Trump and sworn in on March 31, 2020. She left office on January 20, 2021. Between January and July 2021, the office was led by Acting Director Katherine Darke Schmitt.

Kristina Rose is the current Director, appointed by President Joe Biden and sworn into the position on July 12, 2021. Rose previously served as acting director and deputy director for the National Institute of Justice, and as the Chief of Staff for the Office on Violence Against Women.

References

External links
 

Criminal justice
United States Department of Justice
Government agencies established in 1988
1988 establishments in the United States
Compensation for victims of crime
Victims' rights organizations